School Days may refer to:

Film and fiction 
 School Days (1920 film), American comedy starring Larry Semon
 School Days (1921 film), American comedy starring Wesley Barry
 School Days (1995 film), a Taiwan teen drama
 School Days (novel), 2005 by Robert B. Parker
 School Days (visual novel), a 2005 Japanese video game
 Chemin d'école, a novel by Patrick Chamoiseau, published in English as School Days

Music 
 School Days (album), a 1976 album by Stanley Clarke
 School Days, a 1951 album by Dizzy Gillespie
 "School Days" (Chuck Berry song), 1957
 "School Days" (1907 song), American pop song by Will Cobb and Gus Edwards
 "Schooldays", a 1972 song by Gentle Giant from the album Three Friends
 "Schooldays", a 1975 song by The Kinks from the album Schoolboys in Disgrace
 "School Days", a 1977 song by The Runaways from the album Waitin' for the Night
 "School Days", a 1991 song by Joe Walsh from the album Ordinary Average Guy
 School Days (band), a free-jazz quintet including Paal Nilssen-Love

See also
 School Daze (disambiguation)
 Skool Daze, a 1985 ZX Spectrum game